Værøy is an island municipality in Nordland county, Norway. It is part of the traditional district of Lofoten. The administrative centre of the municipality is the village of Sørland on the main island of Værøya. The other village in Værøy is Nordland. Most of the residents live in the Sørland area surrounding the main harbor. The old Værøy Lighthouse sits at the end of that harbor.

The  municipality is the 351st largest by area out of the 356 municipalities in Norway. Værøy is the 347th most populous municipality in Norway with a population of only 678.

General information

The municipality of Værøy was established on 1 January 1838 (see formannskapsdistrikt law). On 1 July 1928, the southern district of Værøy (population: 731) was separated to become the new Røst Municipality.

Name
The Old Norse form of the name was Veðrøy. The first element is veðr which means "weather" (here referring to harsh weather and the exposed and unsheltered position of the island). The last element is øy which means "island". Historically, the name has been spelled Værø.

Coat of arms
The coat of arms was granted on 7 October 1988. The official blazon is "Azure, a puffin argent armed gules". This means the arms have a blue field (background) and the charge is a puffin. The puffin has a tincture of argent which means it is commonly colored white, but if it is made out of metal, then silver is used. The charge is also "armed gules" which means that the beak and feet are colored red. The blue color in the field symbolizes the importance of the sea. The churge is a puffin to represent the fact that they nest in large numbers in the area and historically, they held great importance for the island municipality, both for meat and down feathers. The arms were designed by John Digernes.

Churches
The Church of Norway has one parish within the municipality of Værøy. It is part of the Bodø domprosti (arch-deanery) in the Diocese of Sør-Hålogaland.

Geography

The island municipality is made up of many islands, the two largest islands being Værøya and Mosken. It is located at the end of the Lofoten archipelago. The Norwegian Sea lies to the northwest and the Vestfjorden lies to the southeast. The Moskenstraumen maelstrom lies to the north between Værøya and Moskenesøya.

Climate
The weather in Værøy can be very changeable. Sunshine, rain, wind, and mist may interchange rapidly. The winter climate is mild and the temperature seldom drops below . This makes conditions for stockfish exceptionally good.

Røst and Værøy are among the most northern locations in the world where there is no meteorological winter because the average temperature generally stays above freezing all year. The winter temperatures in southern Lofoten represent the highest temperature anomaly in the world relative to latitude. However, the winter weather is rather windy.
The polar night occurs from December 13–29 and the midnight sun occurs from May 28- July 15.

Værøy has a subpolar oceanic climate (Cfc) with short, cool summers and long winters.

Government
All municipalities in Norway, including Værøy, are responsible for primary education (through 10th grade), outpatient health services, senior citizen services, unemployment and other social services, zoning, economic development, and municipal roads. The municipality is governed by a municipal council of elected representatives, which in turn elect a mayor.  The municipality falls under the Salten District Court and the Hålogaland Court of Appeal.

Municipal council
The municipal council  of Værøy is made up of 13 representatives that are elected to four year terms. The party breakdown of the council is as follows:

Mayor
The mayors of Værøy (incomplete list):
1967-1971: Willy Arne Wold (Sp)
1975-1979: Willy Arne Wold (Sp)
19??-2003: Asmund Berg (Ap)
2003-2015: Harald Adolfsen (H)
2015-2019: Dagfinn Arntsen (KrF)
2019–present: Susann Berg Kristiansen (LL)

Transportation
Helicopter transport is available from Bodø at the Værøy Heliport in Sørland. There was airplane service at Værøy Airport, but it was discontinued after the Værøy accident in 1990 in which five people died. The airport was determined to be in a bad position, due to the location next to a mountain and the frequent presence of strong and unpredictable winds, which made takeoffs and landings dangerous. Ferry service is also available from Bodø, Moskenes, and Røst.

Tourist attractions

Sportfishing for cod, coalfish, and halibut is practiced here.
Turstien is a floodlit track which was opened in 1999. The surface is suitable for bikers, prams, and wheelchairs.
Breivika is situated on the road between Sørland and Nordland, and is the location of the Skarsursanden beach. From the main road there is a signposted path going up Breivikdalen.
Heia has views of the island. It can be reached via a step path called Bjørka, or by following the tarred road up Rømdalen. About halfway there is an old eagle trapping site.
Eagle trapping is a tradition peculiar to the Værøy islanders. They caught eagles with their bare hands. Ancient sites can still be seen, at Rømdalen, for instance.
Gjerdeheia forms a vast and completely flat plateau on top. It can be reached from Breiviksdalen by turning left at the end of the valley or following the path going up Rømdalen and turning right before passing Hornet.
Nordlandsnupen is Værøy's highest mountain. One must reach it by walking up Breiviksdalen and turning right at the end of the valley.
Mollbakken in Nordland consists of smoothly ground round stones. Here, many burial sites from the Viking Age have been found.
Old Værøy Church in  Nordland is the oldest church in Lofoten, built around 1740. The altarpiece dates back to about 1714 and features alabaster figures made in England in 1430.
Nordlandshagen - the Garden of Nordland - is a popular area for the outdoor life. The midnight sun can be seen here from May 30 to July 13.
Mostad is located in the south. The mountainside more or less hangs right over the old, abandoned village of Mostad. This is where the puffin dog originated. Often people will walk from Nordlandshagen.
Norwegian Lundehund or Puffin dog is one of Norway's seven breeds of dogs, and the rarest one. It has an extra toe, is small, and very agile. Puffin dogs were used solely for the puffin hunt and because the hunt was of such great importance to the islanders, this race of dogs managed to survive in Værøy.
Access is only by boat.

In literature
The island of "Vurrgh" in Edgar Allan Poe's story A Descent into the Maelström (1841) is Værøy.

Notable people 
 Willy Arne Wold (1929 in Værøy – 1996) a Norwegian politician, twice Mayor of Værøy in 1960's & 1970's
 Bernhard-Jens Eggesbø (born 1931 in Værøy) a Norwegian military officer and civil servant; worked for NATO
 Guri Ingebrigtsen (1952 in Værøy – 2020) a Norwegian politician, Mayor of Vestvågøy 1999 to 2007

References

External links

VisitVaroy.no - Travel guide for Værøy

Municipal fact sheet from Statistics Norway 

 
Municipalities of Nordland
Populated places of Arctic Norway
1838 establishments in Norway